Stephen Kyle South (born August 29, 1981) is an American politician who has served in the Alabama House of Representatives from the 16th district since 2014.

References

1981 births
Living people
Republican Party members of the Alabama House of Representatives
21st-century American politicians